Sheikh Mohammed bin Khalifa bin Zayed Al Nahyan is an Emirati politician. He is the son of the previous President of the United Arab Emirates, Khalifa bin Zayed Al Nahyan.

Career
Sheikh Mohammed is the member of Executive Council of Abu Dhabi. He is also on the board of directors of Abu Dhabi Investment Authority

In 2009, he was appointed chairman of Abu Dhabi Retirement Pensions and Benefits Fund.

Ancestry

References

External links
Photo at Executive Council of Abu Dhabi

Living people
Emirati politicians
Mohammed bin Khalifa bin Zayed Al
People from Abu Dhabi
Children of presidents of the United Arab Emirates
1972 births
Sons of monarchs